In Greek antiquity, Hermione was the daughter of Menelaus, king of Sparta, and his wife, Helen of Troy. Prior to the Trojan War, Hermione had been betrothed by Tyndareus, her grandfather, to her cousin Orestes, son of her uncle, Agamemnon. She was just nine years old when Paris, son of the Trojan king Priam, arrived to abduct her mother, Helen. 

During the war, Menelaus promised her to Achilles' son, Neoptolemus. After the war ended, he sent Hermione away to the city of Phthia (the home of Peleus and Achilles), where Neoptolemus was staying. The two were married, yet, soon afterwards, Neoptolemus traveled to Delphi in order to exact vengeance against Apollo for having caused his father's death, only to be killed there. With Neoptolemus dead, Hermione was free to marry Orestes, with whom she had a son, Tisamenus.

Mythology

Ancient poets disagree over whether Menelaus was involved in both betrothals. Euripides has Orestes say:

Ovid, on the contrary, says that Menelaus did not even know of the promise made by Tyndareus:

According to the Odyssey, it was ten years after the end of the Trojan War that Hermione was married to Neoptolemus: when Telemachus, son of Odysseus, visited Menelaus in Sparta, he found him

Shortly after settling into the domestic life, conflict arose between Hermione and Andromache (widow of Hector, prince of Troy and elder brother of Paris), the concubine Neoptolemus had obtained as a prize after the sack of Troy. Hermione blamed Andromache for her inability to become pregnant, claiming that she was casting spells on her to keep her barren. She asked her father to kill Andromache and her son while Neoptolemus was away at Delphi, but they are saved by the intervention of Peleus.

Neoptolemus did not return from Delphi. Instead, Hermione's cousin Orestes arrived to report that Neoptolemus had been killed. Reasons for his death vary. In some accounts, he started an altercation at the Temple of Apollo and was killed by a priest, the temple servants, or by the god himself. In other accounts, Orestes found him in Delphi and killed him. Whatever the cause, after Neoptolemus' death, Orestes took Hermione back to Mycenae to fulfill the original promise that Hermione would be his bride.

Hermione and Orestes were married, and she gave birth to his heir Tisamenus. It is said that Orestes also married his half-sister Erigone, daughter of Clytemnestra and Aegisthus, though it is not clear if this happened after Hermione's death or if her marriage to Orestes ended for some other reason.

Hermione eventually joined her parents in Elysium. A scholiast for Nemean X says that, according to Ibycus, Hermione married Diomedes after his apotheosis and that he now lives with her uncles, the Dioscuri, as an immortal god. He is elsewhere said to reside on the Isles of the Blessed, presumably with Hermione herself.

In art and literature
Ermione by Gioachino Rossini
Andromaque by Jean Racine

Notes

References

 Apollodorus, The Library with an English Translation by Sir James George Frazer, F.B.A., F.R.S. in 2 Volumes, Cambridge, MA, Harvard University Press; London, William Heinemann Ltd. 1921. ISBN 0-674-99135-4. Online version at the Perseus Digital Library. Greek text available from the same website.
 Euripides, Andromache with an English translation by David Kovacs. Cambridge. Harvard University Press. 1994. Online version at the Perseus Digital Library. Greek text available from the same website.
 Homer, The Odyssey with an English Translation by A.T. Murray, PH.D. in two volumes. Cambridge, MA., Harvard University Press; London, William Heinemann, Ltd. 1919. . Online version at the Perseus Digital Library. Greek text available from the same website.
 Publius Ovidius Naso, The Epistles of Ovid. London. J. Nunn, Great-Queen-Street; R. Priestly, 143, High-Holborn; R. Lea, Greek-Street, Soho; and J. Rodwell, New-Bond-Street. 1813. Online version at the Perseus Digital Library.
 Publius Ovidius Naso. Amores, Epistulae, Medicamina faciei femineae, Ars amatoria, Remedia amoris. Edition by R. Ehwald; Rudolphi Merkelii; Leipzig. B. G. Teubner. 1907. Latin text available at the Perseus Digital Library.
 Ἑρμιόνη, Georg Autenrieth, A Homeric Dictionary, on Perseus project

Princesses in Greek mythology
Queens in Greek mythology
Laconian characters in Greek mythology
Laconian mythology